Leah Cushman is an American politician from New Hampshire. She is a member of the New Hampshire House of Representatives as a member of the New Hampshire Republican Party. She represents district 2. Cushman is a member of the Health, Human Services and Elderly Affairs Committee.

Biography
In 2014, Cushman earned an associate's degree from Middlesex Community College. She later earned a B.S. in nursing from the University of Massachusetts. Cushman is a registered nurse. In 2017, Cushman and her family moved from Massachusetts to Weare, New Hampshire.

Political positions

Vaccination
Cushman opposes COVID-19 vaccine mandates for religious reasons.

Ivermectin
In 2021, Cushman sponsored a bill that would have allowed over-the-counter sale of ivermectin.

Abortion
In 2021, Cushman voted for HB 625 which prohibits abortion after 24 weeks.

References 

Living people
Republican Party members of the New Hampshire House of Representatives
Women state legislators in New Hampshire
21st-century American politicians
21st-century American women politicians
Year of birth missing (living people)
American nurses